Pirojpur Sadar is an upazila of Pirojpur District in the Division of Barisal, Bangladesh.

Geography
It has 41,893 households and a total area of 278.37 km2.

Demographics
As of the 1991 Bangladesh census, Pirojpur Sadar has a population of 225156. Males constitute 50.93% of the population, and females 49.07%. This Upazila's eighteen up population is 116628. Pirojpur Sadar has an average literacy rate of 50.7% (7+ years), and the national average of 32.4% literate.

Administration
Pirojpur Sadar Upazila is divided into Pirojpur Municipality and seven union parishads: Durgapur, Kadamtala, Kalakhali, Shankorpasha, Shariktola, Sikder Mallik, and Tona. The union parishads are subdivided into 64 mauzas and 98 villages.

Pirojpur Municipality is subdivided into 9 wards and 30 mahallas.

See also
Upazilas of Bangladesh
Districts of Bangladesh
Divisions of Bangladesh

References

Upazilas of Pirojpur District